Riccardo Fortini (3 April 1957 – 30 August 2009) was an Italian high jumper who competed at the 1976 Summer Olympics.

See also
 Men's high jump Italian record progression

References

External links
 

1953 births
2009 deaths
Athletes (track and field) at the 1976 Summer Olympics
Italian male high jumpers
Olympic athletes of Italy